Moje Riba (1890–1982) was an Indian freedom fighter who contributed to the Indian independence movement and was the first person to hoist the Indian national flag in Arunachal Pradesh after independence, on 15 August 1947. He was the first INC President of Arunachal Pradesh. On 15 August 1972, he was awarded the Tamra Patra by the then Prime Minister of India, Smt. Indira Gandhi, for his sacrifice and contribution in the freedom movement. He died on 1982 at his residence in Daring village.

References 

1890 births
1982 deaths
People from Arunachal Pradesh
Indian independence activists from Assam